Gorno Čičevo is a village in the municipality of Gradsko, North Macedonia.

Demographics

As of the 2021 census, Gorno Čičevo had 10 residents with the following ethnic composition:
Macedonians 9
Albanians 1

References

Villages in Gradsko Municipality